Ričardas is a Lithuanian masculine given name, a cognate of Richard and may refer to the following individuals:
Ričardas Bartkevičius (born 1959), Lithuanian painter and educator
Ricardas Beniušis (born 1980), Lithuanian football striker
Ričardas Berankis (born 1990), Lithuanian tennis player
Ričardas Gavelis (1950–2002), Lithuanian writer, playwright and journalist
Ričardas Kuncaitis (born 1993), Lithuanian boxer
Ričardas Mikutavičius (1935–1998), Lithuanian priest, theologist, poet and art collector
Ričardas Šileika (born 1968), Lithuanian writer, essayist and photographer  
Ričardas Tamulis (1938–2008), Lithuanian Olympic boxer 
Ričardas Vaitkevičius (1933–1996), Lithuanian Olympic rower
Ričardas Zdančius (born 1967), Lithuanian football player

Lithuanian masculine given names